The chestnut-tailed starling (Sturnia malabarica), also called grey-headed starling and grey-headed myna is a member of the starling family. It is a resident or partially migratory species found in wooded habitats in India and Southeast Asia. The species name is after the distribution of a former subspecies in the Malabar region. While the chestnut-tailed starling is a winter visitor to peninsular India, the closely related resident breeding population with a white head is now treated as a full species, the Malabar starling (Sturnia blythii).

Taxonomy and distribution
The lack of monophyly in the earlier starling genera has led to this species being placed variously under genus Sturnia, Sturnus and Temenuchus in the past (Zuccon et al., 2006) and studies have suggested the reuse of an old name Temenuchus for members of this clade. Later studies have suggested placement in the genus Sturnia.

There are two subspecies of the chestnut-tailed starling:

S. m. malabarica: northeastern India, Nepal, Bhutan, Bangladesh and northwestern Burma
S. m. nemoricola: southern China, Taiwan, Burma, Thailand, Laos, Vietnam and Cambodia

Both the nominate subspecies and nemoricola are known to perform some poorly understood movements (e.g., S. m. malabarica has been recorded from Pakistan and in central and southern India).

The taxon blythii is now usually (e.g. Rasmussen & Anderton, 2005) considered a valid species, the Malabar starling or white-headed myna (Sturnia blythii), instead of a subspecies of Sturnia malabarica. As S. m. malabarica only visits the range of blythii during the non-breeding period (winter), the two are not known to interbreed. However, a molecular study found the genetic divergence between S. blythii not significantly greater (between 0.2% and 0.8%) than between the sisters S. m. malabarica of northern India and S. m. nemoricola of Burma and Vietnam.

Description
They have grey upperparts and blackish remiges, but the colour of the remaining plumage depends on the subspecies. In the nominate subspecies and blythii, the underparts (incl. undertail) are rufous, but in nemoricola the underparts are whitish tinged rufous, especially on the flanks and crissum (the undertail coverts surrounding the cloaca). The nominate and nemoricola have a light grey head with whitish streaking (especially on crown and collar region). Both subspecies have white irises and a yellow bill with a pale blue base. The sexes are similar, but juveniles have whitish underparts and just chestnut tips to the tail feathers.

Behaviour
The chestnut-tailed starling's nest is typically found in open woodland and cultivation, and it builds a nest in an old barbet or woodpecker hole in a tree-trunk,  up. The normal clutch is 3-5 eggs, pale blue, unmarked. The nesting season is usually March to June.

Like most starlings, it is fairly omnivorous, eating fruit, nectar and insects. They fly in tight flocks and often rapidly change directions with great synchrony.

Notes

References
Grimmett, Richard; Inskipp, Carol, Inskipp, Tim & Byers, Clive (1999): Birds of India, Pakistan, Nepal, Bangladesh, Bhutan, Sri Lanka, and the Maldives. Princeton University Press, Princeton, N.J.. 
Rasmussen, Pamela C. & Anderton John C. (2005): Birds of South Asia: The Ripley Guide. Smithsonian Institution and Lynx Edicions. 
Zuccon D, Cibois A, Pasquet E, Ericson PG. (2006) Nuclear and mitochondrial sequence data reveal the major lineages of starlings, mynas and related taxa. Mol Phylogenet Evol. 41(2):333-44.

chestnut-tailed starling
Birds of Bangladesh
Birds of South China
Birds of South Asia
Birds of Southeast Asia
chestnut-tailed starling
chestnut-tailed starling
Articles containing video clips